San Miguel (IPA: [sɐn mɪ'gɛl]), officially the Municipality of San Miguel, is a 4th class municipality in the province of Leyte, Philippines. According to the 2020 census, it has a population of 19,753 people.

On November 30, 2018, a two-day music & arts festival was held in Guinciaman farm. The "For the Love of Leyte" included local bands, such as Ben&Ben and Itchyworms, and international musicians alongside an immersive program of music, art, and workshops. The movement was to light the talents of the region, both during the music festival and through the long-term initiatives on the island.

History
According to the manuscript written by Lorenzo Babula, one of the old town executives of this municipality, the first people were only few then so their homes were scattered in the forests where they tilled land for subsistence. Later, some settled along the seashore and they fished for food and as a means of livelihood.

As time went on, many of them lived in a place called "Sabang" which means mouth of the river then later it became a small barrio. This was the period when the "Moros" from Jolo who were pirates forced women to go with them to Mindanao so they couldbe sold to their "datu" or ruler as cooks or laundrywomen.

World War II 
On 27 October 1944, American and Filipino forces captured San Miguel from the 14th Area Army of the Imperial Japanese Army under the command of Tomoyuki Yamashita. They proceeded to advance towards Barugo on their way towards the main headquarters at Carigara.

Geography

Barangays
San Miguel is politically subdivided into 21 barangays.

Climate

Demographics

Economy

References

External links
 [ Philippine Standard Geographic Code]
Philippine Census Information
Local Governance Performance Management System

Municipalities of Leyte (province)